The Lomé–Kpalimé railway was the second railway line built in today's Togo.

History 
The railway line was built during the German colonial era. Planning started in 1902, and construction began in 1904. Construction was financed through a 7.8 million Mark loan to the protectorate, with an interest rate of 3.5%. The german company Maschinenfabrik Augsburg-Nürnberg was entrusted with the construction and the operation left to  Noepe was reached in 1905; Kpalimé was reached in 1907. The line opened on 27 January 1907, the birthday of Wilhelm II. The level crossings were equipped with signals to ring bells. The line used the station at Lomé of the Lomé–Aného railway as a terminus. Besides the transport of cocoa, the line also served as transportation method for oil palm products.

Togo was split between the United Kingdom and France after the First World War, with the whole railway network located in the part of the country now handled by France as a League of Nations mandate. During the period of military occupation until 1922, the railway was operated under the Togoland Military Railway (TMR) name, with operations handled by Gold Coast Government Railways, the railway of the neighboring Gold Coast. Only then, from 1922, the railway received its French name  (CFT).

Since it was only a mandate area whose allocation to France under international law did not appear to be permanently secured, France also held back with investments in the railways in Togo. The line continued to operate after Togo gained independence.

See also 

 Rail transport in Togo

References

Literature 
 Helmut Schroeter: Die Eisenbahnen der ehemaligen deutschen Schutzgebiete Afrikas und ihre Fahrzeuge. Frankfurt 1961.

Metre gauge railways in Togo
Maritime Region
Plateaux Region, Togo